Philip Gormley,  is the current CEO for EACH (East Anglia Childrens Hospices) based in Norfolk, England.

Early life
Gormley studied at the University of Gloucestershire, graduating in 1984. He later undertook postgraduate study at the University of Cambridge.

Police career
In 1985, Gormley began his policing career as a constable with Thames Valley Police. In 1999, he was promoted to superintendent and appointed commander with responsibility for the Southern Oxfordshire area. In 2003, he joined the Metropolitan Police and was appointed Commander of Specialist Operations. In 2005, he organised the merger of the Anti-Terrorist Branch and Special Branch into what would become the Counter Terrorism Command in 2006.

From 2007 to 2010, Gormley was Deputy Chief Constable of West Midlands Police. From 22 March 2010 to 2013, he was Chief Constable of Norfolk Constabulary. He was the second highest paid Chief Constable in the United Kingdom with a salary of £260,000. In May 2013, he was appointed Deputy Director General of the newly created National Crime Agency (NCA). As of 2015, Gormley was paid a salary of £185,000 by the NCA, making him one of the 328 most highly paid people in the British public sector at that time. In March 2015, it was announced that he would be leaving the NCA in the Autumn of 2015. He stepped down in October 2015.

On 2 December 2015, it was announced that Gormley would be the next Chief Constable of Police Scotland. He was only the second CC of the force after the Scottish police forces merged in 2013. He beat two of the Deputy Chief Constables for Police Scotland to the job; Neil Richardson, the Designated Deputy for Chief Constable, and Iain Livingstone, the Deputy Chief Constable (crime and operational support). He took up the appointment on 5 January 2016, with a salary of £212,280.

On 26 July 2017, Gormley announced that he was the subject of, and cooperating with, a misconduct investigation by the Police Investigations and Review Commissioner (PIRC), following a referral by the Scottish Police Authority (SPA). On 7 February 2018, he resigned from his Police Scotland post with immediate effect, being replaced on a temporary basis by his deputy Iain Livingstone, who had already been leading the organisation in Gormley's absence for some months.

In October 2018, Gormley was appointed HM Inspector of Constabulary and HM Inspector of Fire & Rescue Services for the Northern Region.

Honours
In the 2013 New Year Honours, Gormley was awarded the Queen's Police Medal (QPM) in recognition of his service as Chief Constable of Norfolk Police.

Charitable Work

As of 2020, Gormley has undertaken the role of Chief Executive of EACH (East Anglia's Children's Hospices). He led the charity through financial struggle during the 2020 Covid-19 pandemic, which resulted in temporary charity shop closure and cancellation of fundraising events.

Personal life
Gormley has resided in Norfolk, England since 2010.

References 

 

 
 
 
 
 
 
 
 

Living people
1963 births
British Chief Constables
English people of Irish descent
Date of birth missing (living people)
Alumni of the University of Gloucestershire
English recipients of the Queen's Police Medal
Alumni of the University of Cambridge
Inspectors of Constabulary